Mount Price may refer to:

 Mount Price (British Columbia), Canada
 Mount Price (California), United States
 Mount Price (Washington), United States
 Mount Price (Antarctica)
 Mount Tom Price, Australia, see Hamersley Range

See also
 Price (disambiguation)
 Price Peak, Marie Byrd Land, Antarctica
 Price Hill (disambiguation)